Kenshō (見性) is a Japanese term from the Zen tradition. Ken means "seeing", shō means "nature, essence". It is usually translated as "seeing one's (true) nature", that is, the Buddha-nature or nature of mind.

Kenshō is an initial insight or awakening, not full Buddhahood. It is to be followed by further training to deepen this insight, and learn to express it in daily life.

The term kenshō is often used interchangeably with satori, which is derived from the verb satoru, and means "comprehension; understanding".

Terminology
The Chinese Buddhist term jianxing compounds:
 jian 見 "see, observe, meet with, perceive";
 xing 性 "(inborn) nature, character, personality, disposition, property, quality, gender".

History
Buddhist monks who produced Sanskrit-Chinese translations of sutras faced many linguistic difficulties:
 They chose Chinese jian 見 to translate Sanskrit dṛś दृश् "see, look", and the central Buddhist idea of dṛṣṭi दृष्टि "view, seeing (also with the mind's eye), wisdom, false view".
 Translators used xing 性 or zixing 自性 "self-nature" for Sanskrit svabhāva स्वभाव "intrinsic nature, essential nature".
Thus, jianxing was the translation for dṛṣṭi-svabhāva, "view one's essential nature".

The (c. 8th century) Chinese Platform Sutra (2, Prajñā "wisdom, understanding") first records jianxing.

Pronunciations
The Standard Chinese pronunciation jianxing historically derives from (c. 7th century CE) Middle Chinese kienCsjäŋC. Sino-Xenic pronunciations of this term exist:
 kenshō  見性 or ケンショウ (on'yomi) in Sino-Japanese vocabulary
  in Sino-Korean vocabulary
 kiến tính in Sino-Vietnamese vocabulary.

Meanings of kenshō

Translating kenshō into English is semantically complex.

Encyclopedic and dictionary definitions
Some encyclopedia and dictionary definitions are:
 Soothill (1934): "To behold the Buddha-nature within oneself, a common saying of the Chan (Zen) or Intuitive School."
 Fischer-Schreiber (1991): Lit. "seeing nature"; Zen expression for the experience of awakening (enlightenment). Since the meaning is "seeing one's own true nature," kenshō is usually translated "self-realization." Like all words that try to reduce the conceptually ungraspable experience of enlightenment to a concept, this one is also not entirely accurate and is even misleading, since the experience contains no duality of "seer" and "seen" because there is no "nature of self' as an object that is seen by a subject separate from it.
 Baroni (2002): "Seeing one's nature," that is, realizing one's own original Buddha Nature. In the Rinzai school, it most often refers more specifically to one's initial enlightenment attained through kōan practice.
 Muller (year unknown): To see one's own originally enlightened mind. To behold the Buddha-nature within oneself, a common saying of the Chan school, as seen for example, in the phrase 'seeing one's nature, becoming Buddha'  見性成佛.

Definitions by Buddhist scholars
Buddhist scholars have defined kenshō as:
 D.T. Suzuki: "Looking into one's nature or the opening of satori"; "This acquiring of a new point of view in our dealings with life and the world is popularly called by Japanese Zen students 'satori' (wu in Chinese). It is really another name for Enlightenment (Annuttara-samyak-sambodhi)".
 Dumoulin (1988/2005): "Enlightenment is described here as an insight into the identity of one's own nature with all of reality in an eternal now, as a vision that removes all distinctions. This enlightenment is the center and the goal of the Zen way. Hakuin prefers the term "seeing into one's nature", which for him means ultimate reality. The Buddha nature and the cosmic Buddha body, wisdom (prajna), and emptiness (sunyata), the original countenance one had before one was born, and other expressions from the rich palette of Mahayana terms were all familiar to him from his continued study of the sutras and Zen literature."
 Peter Harvey (1990): "It is a blissful realization where a person's inner nature, the originally pure mind, is directly known as an illuminating emptiness, a thusness which is dynamic and immanent in the world."
 G. Victor Sogen Hori (2000): "The term consists of two characters: ken, which means "see" or "seeing", and sho, which means "nature", "character", "quality." To "see one's nature" is the usual translation for kensho".

Definitions by Buddhist teachers and practitioners
Buddhist teachers and practitioners have defined kenshō as:
 Jiyu-Kennett: "To see into one's own nature. The experience of enlightenment, satori."
 Myodo Ni Satomi, a student of Hakuun Yasutani (1993): "Seeing the-self, that is, the true self or Buddha nature."

Further notions
According to Hori, the term kenshō refers to the realization of non-duality of subject and object in general, but the term kenshō may also be applied in other contexts: "How do you kenshō this?"

Kenshō is not a single experience, but refers to a whole series of realizations from a beginner's shallow glimpse of the nature of mind, up to a vision of emptiness equivalent to the 'Path of Seeing' or to Buddhahood itself. In all of these, the same 'thing' is known, but in different degrees of clarity and profundity.

"Kenshō" is commonly translated as enlightenment, a word that is also used to translate bodhi, prajna, satori and buddhahood. Western discourse tends to use these terms interchangeably, but there is a distinction between a first insight and the further development toward Buddhahood.

Insight versus experience

Kensho is insight, an understanding of our essential nature as Buddha-nature, or the nature of mind, the perceiving subject itself, which was equated with Buddha-nature by the East Mountain school.

Contemporary understanding also describes kensho as an experience, as in "enlightenment experience"; the term "enlightenment experience" is itself a tautology: "Kensho (enlightenment) is an enlightenment (kensho)-experience". The notion of "experience" fits in a popular set of dichotomies: pure (unmediated) versus mediated, noncognitive versus cognitive, experiential versus intellectual, intuitive versus intellectual, nonrational versus rational, nondiscursive versus discursive, nonpropositional versus propositional.

The notion of pure experience (junsui kuiken) to interpret and understand kensho was introduced by Nishida Kitaro in his An Inquiry into the Good (1911), under influence of "his somewhat idiosyncratic reading of western philosophy", especially William James, who wrote The Varieties of Religious Experience. Wayne Proudfoot traces the roots of the notion of "religious experience" to the German theologian Friedrich Schleiermacher (1768-1834), who argued that religion is based on a feeling of the infinite. The notion of "religious experience" was used by Schleiermacher to defend religion against the growing scientific and secular critique. It was adopted by many scholars of religion, of which William James was the most influential. D.T. Suzuki, who introduced Nishida Kitaro to western philosophy, took over this notion of pure experience, describing it as the essence of all religions, but best represented in what he considered the "superior Japanese culture and religion".

The influence of western psychology and philosophy on Japanese Buddhism was due to the persecution of Buddhism at the beginning of the Meiji Restoration, and the subsequent efforts to construct a New Buddhism (shin bukkyo), adapted to the modern times. It was this New Buddhism which has shaped the understanding of Zen in the west, especially through the writings of D.T. Suzuki and the Sanbo Kyodan, an exponent of the Meiji-era opening of Zen-training for lay-followers.

The notion of "experience" has been criticised. Robert Sharf points out that "experience" is a typical western term, which has found its way into Asian religiosity via western influences. The notion of "experience" introduces a false notion of duality between "experiencer" and "experienced", where-as the essence of kensho is the realisation of the "non-duality" of observer and observed. "Pure experience" does not exist; all experience is mediated by intellectual and cognitive activity. The specific teachings and practices of a specific tradition may even determine what "experience" someone has, which means that this "experience" is not the proof of the teaching, but a result of the teaching. A pure consciousness without concepts, reached by "cleaning the doors of perception", would be an overwhelming chaos of sensory input without coherence.

The notion of "experience" also over-emphasises kensho, as if it were the single goal of Zen-training, where-as the Zen-tradition clearly states that "the stink of Zen" has to be removed and the "experience" of kensho has to be integrated into daily life. In the Rinzai-school this post-satori training includes the study and mastering of great amounts of classical Chinese poetry, which is far from "universal" and culture-transcending. On the contrary, it demands an education in culture-specific language and behaviour, which is measured by specific and strict cultural norms. Emphasising "experience" "reduces the sophisticated dialectic of Ch'an/Zen doctrine and praxis to a mere "means" or set of techniques intended to inculcate such experiences".

Kenshō accounts

Classical accounts
Classical Zen texts, such as the Kao-seng-chuan (Biographies of Eminent Monks) and the transmission lists, called "Transmission of the Lamp" the yü-lü genre (the recorded sayings of the masters, such as the Linji yü lü); and the various koan-collections, contain accounts of "enlightenment experiences". These accounts are not verbatim recordings of such "experiences", but well-edited texts, written down decades or even decennia after the supposed sayings and meetings.

The Denkōroku, "The Record of the Transmission of the Light", written by Keizan Jōkin 瑩山紹瑾 (1268–1325), is an example of the "Transmission of the Lamp" genre. It contains literary accounts of the patriarchs of the Soto-lineage, from Shakyamuni Buddha to Koun Ejō, in which kensho plays a central role. They are not to be taken as literal accounts of awakening, but as stories underpinning the legitimacy of the Dogen-shu, which in its early history had seen a fierce internal conflict over the correct lineage during the Sandai sōron.

Dōgen Zenji's awakening is recalled in the Denkoroku:

Hakuin gives this description of his first kensho, when he was 21:

Hakuin's kensho was not approved by Shoju Rojin, who subjected Hakuin to more koan-training. This resulted in a second kensho, where-after Hakuin left Shoju Rojin. It was only when he was 41 that he attained "his final great enlightenment":

Contemporary accounts
Although the Zen tradition is reluctant to speak openly about the 'experience' of kensho, personal accounts can be found in Zen texts. Keido Fukushima, a 20th-century Rinzai abbott, gives the following description:

Spontaneous kenshō
Kenshō may be attained without the aid of a teacher. For example, Richard Clarke (1933), who studied with Philip Kapleau, states that he had a spontaneous kensho when he was 13. Dennis Genpo Merzel states he had what he described as an "awakening experience" in 1971:

More descriptions of "spontaneous kensho" can be found throughout the Zen-literature,

Alternate accounts

Houn Jiyu-Kennett, a 20th-century Soto Zen Oshō, i.e. "priest" or "teacher," and the first Western female Zen priest, had a prolonged religious experience in the 1970s, including a series of visions and recalling past lives, when she was severely ill. She regarded these experiences as "a profound kensho (enlightenment) experience," constituting a third kensho, and published an account of these visions, and an elaborate scheme of stages of awakening, in How to Grow a Lotus Blossom. Her interpretations, which parallel Christian mysticism, were controversial, and rejected by some as makyo ("illusion"). According to Jiyu-Kennett, such experiences are not uncommon, but are rarely spoken of; she regarded publishing her own experiences as a way to acknowledge the existence and validity of such experiences, which, according to her, may contribute to further insight after initial awakening. She acknowledged the risks and potential for controversy in publishing her account, but felt that the benefits of releasing such information outweighed the risks.

Training towards kenshō

According to Harris, working towards kensho is usually a lengthy process stretched out over years or even decades. Contrary to this, Victor Hori notes that with koan-study kensho may appear within six months.

Sōtō tends towards a gradual approach, preferring to let the experiences happen on their own. Rinzai tends toward the use of Koans as a technique to unroot the habitual workings of the mind.

During intensive zazen various hallucinations and psychological disturbances may arise. These are referred to as makyo. Distinguishing these delusions from actual kensho is the primary function of the teacher, as the student may be erroneously convinced they have realized kensho.

Rinzai
In the Rinzai school, kensho is seen as indispensable:

In the Rinzai-training, the student is expected to pour oneself totally into both koan-study and daily activities 'to become one' with it. Kenshō is used to describe the first breakthrough in kōan study.

Sōtō
Contemporary Japanese Sōtō downplays the importance of kenshō, due to the sectarian rivalry with Rinzai, which emphasizes kenshō. Nevertheless, kenshō also has its role in Sōtō. The "genjo-koan", or the "koan of everyday life" which "appears naturally in daily life", is emphasized. Students are not encouraged to actively seek out kenshō experiences. In Sōtō practice kenshōs "are allowed to occur naturally, as a by-product of practice. Meditative training is seen as the unfolding of one great kenshō:

According to Brad Warner, in the Sōtō school there are two kinds of awakening. One is the practice of shikantaza, which is the "actual enlightened activity of the Buddha". The other is the accumulation of little bits of understanding, which come together, giving way to a deeper intuitive knowledge.

Sanbō Kyōdan
Kenshō also plays a central in the Sanbō Kyōdan, a Japanese Zen organisation which played a decisive role in the transmission of Zen to the United States. Yasutani, the founder of the Sanbo Kyodan, was disappointed about the lack of interest in kensho in the Soto school. Yasutani's emphasis on koan training and the importance of kensho was transmitted to his American students:

It is also reflected in the inclusion of a relative great amount of kensho stories in "The Three Pillars of Zen", written by Philip Kapleau, a student of Yasutani.

Training after kenshō

After kensho, further practice is needed to attain a natural, effortless, down-to-earth state of being, the "ultimate liberation", "knowing without any kind of defilement".

Further practice

Zen Buddhist training does not end with kenshō. Practice is to be continued to deepen the insight and to express it in daily life. According to the contemporary Chan Master Sheng Yen:

And the Soto Zen Master Jiyu-Kennett:

To deepen the initial insight of kensho, shikantaza and kōan-study are necessary. This trajectory of initial insight followed by a gradual deepening and ripening is expressed by Linji Yixuan in his Three mysterious Gates, the Four Ways of Knowing of Hakuin, and the Ten Ox-Herding Pictures which detail the steps on the Path.

Seitai choyo
Post-awakening practice is called seitai choyo, the "long nurturing of the sacred fetus". According to Spiegelberg,

During the T'ang-era, the term became associated with the ideal of the recluse who leaves the world. An ideal period of "twenty years" was taken for it, echoing a story from the Lotus Sutra about a prodigal son who wandered in poverty for twenty years before returning home. References to these twenty years are found throughout the Chán-tradition, for example Linji, who is reported to have studied under Huang-po for twenty years, and Daito, the founder of Daitoku-ji, who famously spent twenty years living under a bridge with beggars.

Cultivating bodhicitta

According to Hakuin, the main aim of "post-satori practice" (gogo no shugyo or kojo, "going beyond") is to cultivate the "Mind of Enlightenment", "benefiting others by giving them the gift of the Dharma teaching". According to Yamada Koun, "if you cannot weep with a person who is crying, there is no kensho". According to Kay,

According to Barry, regarding Hakuin's practice after awakening,

Self-purification and intellectual understanding
One also has to purify oneself by ongoing practice, since 

And "experience" has to be supplemented by intellectual understanding and study of the Buddhist teachings; otherwise one remains a zen temma, a "Zen devil".

Sudden insight

Kenshō is described as appearing suddenly, upon an interaction with someone else, at hearing or reading some significant phrase, or at the perceiving of an unexpected sound or sight. The idea of "sudden insight" has been hotly debated in the history of Zen. It became part of the Traditional Zen Narrative in the 8th century.

Chinul, a 12th-century Korean Seon master, emphasized that insight into our true nature is sudden, but is to be followed by practice to ripen the insight and attain full Buddhahood. The contemporary Korean Seon master Seongcheol opposed this, emphasizing "sudden enlightenment, sudden cultivation". But Jiyu-Kennett, a contemporary western teacher, warns that attaining kenshō does not mean that a person is free from morality, the laws of karma, or the consequences of ones actions. This warning is reflected in the Wild fox koan.

Mushi-dokugo and mushi-dokkaku

Kenshō may be attained without the aid of a teacher, as in the case of mushi-dokugo or (mushi-)dokkaku, a self-awakened pratyeka-buddha.

Though the literal meaning is self-awakened or awakened on one's own, the emphasis in Zen, when using these terms, lies in the ultimate reliance on one's own insight, instead of the authority of a teacher:

Similarities with other traditions
While the Japanese term "kenshō" is generally used by practitioners of Zen Buddhism, the insight it refers to is not limited to Japanese Zen Buddhism, or even to Buddhism in general.

Theravada

The Theravada tradition, which is best known in the west through the modern Vipassana movement, discerns four stages of enlightenment, in which Nirvana is being reached in four succeeding sudden steps of insight.

Dzogchen

An analogy given by Dzogchen masters is that one's nature is like a mirror which reflects with complete openness, but is not affected by the reflections. Rigpa is the knowledge that ensues from recognizing this mirror-like clarity, which cannot be found by searching nor identified. One knows that there is a primordial freedom from grasping his or her mind.

Advaita Vedanta

In Advaita Vedanta moksha is attained by jnana, insight-knowledge. In Shankara's philosophical synthesis insight samadhi is used as a subsidiary to this goal. Swami Vivekananda emphasized the experience of nirvikalpa samadhi as a means to validate religious, transcendental knowledge.

See also

 Enlightenment
 Satori
 Daigo
 Mushi dokugo
 Shoshin
 Epiphany
 Samadhi

Notes

References

Sources

Printed sources

Web-sources

Further reading
Soto
 
Sanbo Kyodan
 
Critical
 Stuart Lachs, Coming Down from the Zen Clouds: A Critique of the Current State of American Zen An attempt at demythologizing Zen-practice, emphasizing the integration into daily life

External links
 Ama Samy, Koan, Hua-t’ou, and Kensho
 Rev.Master Jiyu-Kennett (2000), ''The Roar of the Tigress Volume I, An Introduction to Zen: Religious Practice for Everyday Life biography of Jiyu-Kennett, with a description of het kensho-experiences, and teishos by Jiyu-Kennett
 After Non Duality, ablog centering on the question "What happens after awakening?"

Zen Buddhist philosophical concepts
Nondualism